The 1964–65 season was Manchester United's 63rd season in the Football League, and their 20th consecutive season in the top division of English football. They finished the season as league champions for the sixth time in their history, with teenage winger George Best making headlines by establishing himself in the first team and finding the net 10 times in the league and 14 times in all competitions, though Denis Law was once again the club's top goalscorer with 28 goals in the league and 39 in all competitions.

First Division

FA Cup

Inter-Cities Fairs Cup

Squad statistics

References

Manchester United F.C. seasons
Manchester United
1965